Clive Raymond Farquhar (c. 1896 – c. 1941) was a rugby union player who represented Australia.

Farquhar, a centre, was born in Sydney and claimed 1 international rugby cap for Australia.

References

                   

Australian rugby union players
Australia international rugby union players
Year of birth uncertain
Rugby union players from Sydney
Rugby union centres